This page lists all of the numbered regional roads in Peel Region, Ontario.

See also

List of roads in Brampton
List of roads in Mississauga

References

 
Peel